Gaochang was an ancient kingdom in modern Turpan, China.

Gaochang may also refer to:

Gaochang District, the main urban district of Turpan, formerly the county-level city of Turpan
Gaochang Subdistrict, within Gaochang District
Qocho, a Uyghur kingdom that succeeded ancient Gaochang